Jones Bridge Massacre (Task Force Clabio) is a 1989 Filipino crime action film based on the titular incident on June 8, 1989. Directed by Ben "M7" Yalung, the film stars Lito Lapid, Jackie Aquino, Eddie Garcia, Paquito Diaz, Berting Labra, Ruel Vernal, Robert Talabis, Rez Cortez, King Gutierrez and Edwin Reyes. Produced by Cine Suerte, the film was released on October 25, 1989.

Critic Justino Dormiendo of the National Midweek gave the film a positive review for its "engrossing" storytelling, though he was nevertheless critical of the decision to exploit a tragic incident for mass consumption.

Cast

Lito Lapid as P/Lt. Col. Aladdin Dimagmaliw
Jackie Aquino
Eddie Garcia
Paquito Diaz
Berting Labra
Ruel Vernal
Robert Talabis
Rez Cortez
King Gutierrez
Edwin Reyes
Renato del Prado
Manjo del Mundo
Ernie Zarate as Alfredo Lim
Romy Romulo
Myleen Gonzales
Rose Ann Gonzales
Frank Lapid
Polly Cagsawan
Rene Yalung
Roldan Aquino
Joey Padilla

Gloria Romero

Production
Director Ben "M7" Yalung of Cine Suerte announced in July 1989 that he will produce a film adaptation of the June 8 incident, having consulted with both Western Police District chief Alfredo Lim and Movie and Television Review and Classification Board (MTRCB) chairman Manuel Morato regarding his intention. Phillip Salvador was originally cast as Lt. Col. Dimagmaliw. However, he was still on vacation and director Yalung was pressured to release the film while the incident was still of interest. As a result, Lito Lapid took over the role.

Release
Jones Bridge Massacre was released in theaters in late October 1989. Brig. Gen. Alfredo Lim, director of the National Bureau of Investigation (NBI), was reportedly impressed by the film's trailer alone, and thus gave his endorsement of the film.

Critical response
Justino Dormiendo, writing for the National Midweek, gave Jones Bridge Massacre a positive review, praising its "engrossing" storytelling, the well-defined characterization of Aladdin, and the "gratifying" plot twist. However, he still cited numerous shortcomings of the film, such as the caricatured portrayal of real life figures such as Alfredo Lim and Jejomar Binay, the presumptuous stance the filmmakers took in presenting the twist as accurate to real life, and the film's apparent exploitation of "an all-too real event" for a mass audience.

References

External links

1989 films
1980s crime films
1989 action films
Action films based on actual events
Crime films based on actual events
Cultural depictions of Alfredo Lim
Filipino-language films
Films about military personnel
Films about police officers
Films about robbery
Films set in Manila
Philippine action films
Philippine crime films
Cine Suerte films